Proctocolitis is a general term for inflammation of the rectum and colon.

Signs and symptoms

Cause
Proctocolitis has many possible causes. Common infectious causes of proctocolitis include Chlamydia trachomatis, LGV (Lymphogranuloma venereum), Neisseria gonorrhoeae, HSV, and Helicobacter species. It can also be idiopathic (see colitis), vascular (as in ischemic colitis), or autoimmune (as in inflammatory bowel disease).

Diagnosis
Anoscopy can be used to diagnose the majority of cases of proctocolitis.

Treatment 
Antibiotics, such as ceftriaxone and doxycycline, if there is  infection

See also
 Colitis
 Proctitis

References

External links 

Gastrointestinal tract disorders